Programmed Airline Reservations System (PARS) is an IBM proprietary large scale airline reservation application, a computer reservations system, executing under the control of IBM Airline Control Program (ACP) (and later its successor, Transaction Processing Facility (TPF)). Its international version was known as IPARS.

By the 1960s, with the American Airlines SABRE reservations system up and running, IBM offered its expertise to other airlines, and soon developed Deltamatic for Delta Air Lines on the IBM 7074, and PANAMAC for Pan American World Airways using an IBM 7080. By 1967/8 IBM generalized its airline reservations work into the PARS system, which ran on the larger members of the IBM System/360 family and which could support the largest airlines' needs at that time (e.g. United Airlines ran about 3000 reservations terminals online in the 1972 timeframe). In the early 1970s IBM modified its PARS reservations system so it could accommodate the smaller regional airlines on smaller members of the 370 systems family. The high performance PARS operating system evolved from ACP (Airlines Control Program) to TPF (Transaction Processing Facility).

In the early days of automated reservations systems in the 1960s and 1970s the combination of ACP and PARS provided unprecedented scale and performance from an on-line real-time system, and for a considerable period ranked among the largest networks and systems of the era. In the early 1970s major US banks were developing major on-line teleprocessing applications systems and were in urgent need of ACP's high performance capabilities. ACP was made available by IBM to the banking industry in the mid-1970s. This system was used by the great majority of large airlines in the US and internationally; and its smaller 1970's version was used by many smaller regional airlines. PARS (and IPARS) was extremely successful, and it massively improved and revolutionized the efficiency of airlines passenger operations and their profitability.

Along with many other major and regional US airlines, the PARS system was later used by TWA and Northwest Airlines.   In this context PARS was also used as a marketing name by TWA when selling their system to travel agencies.
Swiss International Air Lines and Brussels Airlines discontinued using PARS beginning of 2016. IranAir, the Iranian National Airline, discontinued using IBM-ACP/IPARS at the beginning of 2000 due to Year 2000 (Y2K) problem.

CPARS (Compact Programmed Airlines Reservations) was used by smaller airlines (e.g. Icelandair).   Among other limitations (compared to PARS) was a shorter booking horizon of 90 days.

References

Further reading 
 Winston, Clifford, "The Evolution of the Airline Industry", Brookings Institution Press, 1995. . Cf. p. 62.

IBM software
Travel technology
IBM mainframe software